Drop Out of Life is the second and final studio album by American pop punk band This Time Next Year. In October and November, the band supported New Found Glory on their Pop Punk's Not Dead tour of the U.S.

Reception 

Drop Out of Life was met with mostly positive review from critics. Thomas Nassiff from AbsolutePunk notes how it is a significant departure in sound from the band's previous album, Road Maps and Heart Attacks.

Track list

References 

2011 albums
Equal Vision Records albums